Ceilodiastrophon is a genus of moths of the family Noctuidae. The genus was erected by George Thomas Bethune-Baker in 1908. Both species are known from New Guinea.

Species
Ceilodiastrophon albopunctata (Bethune-Baker, 1908)
Ceilodiastrophon brunneum Bethune-Baker, 1908

References

Herminiinae